The Pepperstone ATP rankings are the merit-based method used by the Association of Tennis Professionals (ATP) for determining the qualification for entry as well as the seeding of players in all singles and doubles tournaments. The first rankings for singles were published on 23 August 1973 while the doubles players were ranked for the first time on 1 March 1976. Ranking points are awarded according to the stage of tournament reached, and the prestige of the tournament, with the four Grand Slam tournaments awarding the most points. The rankings are updated every Monday, and points are dropped 52 weeks after being awarded (with the exception of the ATP Finals, from which points are dropped on the Monday following the last ATP Tour event of the following year). Carlos Alcaraz is the current world No. 1 in men's singles.

History 
The ATP began as the men's trade union in 1972, through the combined efforts of Jack Kramer, Cliff Drysdale, and Donald Dell, and rose to prominence when 81 of its members boycotted the 1973 Wimbledon Championships. Just two months later, in August, the ATP introduced its ranking system intended to objectify tournament entry criteria, which up to that point were controlled by national federations and tournament directors.

The ATP's new ranking system was quickly adopted by men's tennis. While virtually all ATP members were in favor of objectifying event participation, the system's first No. 1, Ilie Năstase, lamented that "everyone had a number hanging over them," fostering a more competitive and less collegial atmosphere among the players.

The original ATP ranking criteria, which were then regularly published weekly only from mid-1979 and persisted through the 1980s, were based on averaging each player's results, though the details were revised a number of times. Starting in 1990, in conjunction with the expansion of ATP purview as the new men's tour operator, the ranking criteria were replaced with a 'best of' system modeled after competitive downhill skiing. This 'best of' system originally used 14 events but expanded to 18 in 2000. The computer that calculates the rankings is nicknamed "Blinky".

Overview 
A player's ATP ranking is based on the total points he accrued in the following 20 tournaments (19 if he did not qualify for the ATP Finals):
The four Grand Slam tournaments
The eight mandatory ATP Masters 1000 tournaments,
The previous ATP Finals count until the Monday following the final regular-season ATP event of the following year.
The best seven results from the non-mandatory ATP Masters 1000, all ATP 500 series, ATP 250 series, ATP Challenger Tour, Futures Series and ATP Cup tournaments played in the calendar year
For a better result within the same tour type to be transposed one has to wait for the expiry of the first worse result from previous year. It only expires at the drop date of that tournament and only if the player reached a worse result or has not entered the current year.

Ranking points gained in a tournament are dropped 52 weeks later, with the exception of the ATP Finals, from which points are dropped on the Monday following the last ATP Tour event of the following year.

The Monte-Carlo Masters 1000 became optional in 2009, but if a player chooses to participate in it, its result is counted and his fourth-best result in an ATP 500 event is ignored (his three best ATP 500 results remain). From 2009 until 2015, if a player did not play enough ATP 500 events and did not have an ATP 250 or Challenger appearance with a better result, the Davis Cup was counted in the 500's table. The World Team Cup was also included before its cancellation in 2012.

For the Davis Cup, from 2009 until 2015, points were distributed for the World Group countries. Instead of having an exact drop date they were gradually updated at each phase of the competition, comparing the player's results with his results from the previous year. (e.g. if a player played two matches in a semifinal but plays one the next year only that one missing match would be extracted from his points).

A player who is out of competition for 30 or more days, due to a verified injury, will not receive any penalty. The ATP Finals will count as an additional 20th tournament in the ranking of its eight qualifiers at season's end.

For every Grand Slam tournament or mandatory ATP Masters 1000 tournament for which a player is not in the main draw, and was not (and, in the case of a Grand Slam tournament, would not have been, had he and all other players entered) a main draw direct acceptance on the original acceptance list, and never became a main draw direct acceptance, the number of his results from all other eligible tournaments in the ranking period that count for his ranking is increased by one.

Once a player is accepted in the main draw of a Grand Slam tournament or ATP Masters 1000 tournament, his result in this tournament counts for his ranking, regardless of whether he participates. A player's withdrawal from an ATP 500 event, regardless of whether the withdrawal was on time, results in a zero point included as one of his best of four results. Further non-consecutive withdrawals results in a zero point allocation replacing the next best positive result for each additional withdrawal.

Players with multiple consecutive withdrawals who are out of competition for 30 days or longer because of injury are not subject to a ranking penalty as long as verified and approved medical forms are provided; or, a player will not have the ranking penalty imposed if he completes the Promotional Activities requirement as specified under "Repeal of Withdrawal Fines and/or Penalties" or if the on-site withdrawal procedures apply. Players may also appeal withdrawal penalties to a Tribunal who will determine whether the penalties are affirmed or set aside.

Between 2000 and 2012, ranking points were awarded based on results in the Summer Olympics. This was changed before the 2016 Olympics where no ranking points were awarded.

With these rules, a player playing and winning the mandatory 4 Grand Slams and 8 ATP Masters 1000 events, a further 6 ATP 500 events and the Monte-Carlo Masters 1000 can amass a total of 20,000 points before the ATP Finals and end the calendar year with a maximum of 21,500 points. , the maximum points achieved by any player since 2009 is 16,950 by Novak Djokovic, on June 6, 2016.

ATP race 

The ATP Race is an annual points race to determine the year-end No. 1 singles player and doubles team in the ATP rankings system used by the ATP. The race, initially called the "ATP Champions Race", was introduced by the ATP for the 2000 season as part of their "21st Century Tennis" strategy announced in 1999. All players and teams start the year with zero points, and accumulate points from tournament to tournament based on their performances. The player and team who ends the tennis season with the most points is crowned the year-end No. 1, and the top 8 players and teams participate in the year-end championship, the ATP Finals.

Ranking method 
Since the introduction of the ATP rankings the method used to calculate a player's ranking points has changed several times.

Points distribution (2009–present) 

(ATP Masters 1000 series) Qualifying points changes to 12 points only if the main draw is larger than 56.
(ATP 500 series) Qualifying points changes to 10 points only if the main draw is larger than 32.
(ATP 250 series) Qualifying points changes to 5 points only if the main draw is larger than 32.
Players who draw a bye in the first round in the ATP 1000 series and lose their first match in the second round are considered to have lost their first round and receive the points equivalent to first round loss. Similarly, loss in the second round of the ATP 500 series and the ATP 250 series after drawing bye in first round will result in 0 points being awarded.

In addition qualifiers and main draw entry players will then also receive the points in brackets for the rounds they reached.

Starting in 2016, points were no longer awarded for Davis Cup ties, nor for the tennis tournament at the Summer Olympics.

Current rankings

Top 8 singles players points breakdown 

 The total points for a player is the accumulation of points earned from his best 19 tournaments (20 for the eight players who make the ATP Finals).
 The results of all Big tournaments (Grand Slams, Masters and the ATP Finals) are included in the breakdown.
 Only the titles and finals results are included for the other tournaments.

ATP No. 1 ranked singles players

Players with highest career rank 2–5 
The following is a list of players who were ranked world No. 5 or higher but not No. 1 since the 1973 introduction of the ATP rankings (active players in bold).

Players with highest career rank 6–10 
The following is a list of players who were ranked world No. 6 to No. 10 since the 1973 introduction of the ATP rankings (active players in bold).

Year-end Top 10 
★ indicates player's highest year-end ranking

Note: Not all year-end rankings listed were taken from 31 December. Due to the Australian Open's date in the 1970s through to the mid-1980s, the year-end ranking in 1974, 1978–1984 were recorded from varying dates.

ATP rankings achievements

Total weeks 
, with currently-ranked players in boldface

Year-end rankings 
As of the end of 2022, with active players in boldface

ATP No. 1 in singles and doubles 
Players who were ranked No. 1 in both singles and doubles at any time in their careers.

 McEnroe was ranked No. 1 in singles and doubles simultaneously for 121 weeks.
 McEnroe finished as the year-end No. 1 in both singles and doubles for 3 years: 1981, 1982, and 1983.

ATP No. 1 ranked doubles players

See also 
List of ATP number 1 ranked singles tennis players
List of ATP number 1 ranked doubles tennis players
World number 1 ranked male tennis players
Top ten ranked male tennis players
Top ten ranked male tennis players (1912–1972)
ITF World Champions
List of highest ranked tennis players per country
WTA rankings
Current tennis rankings

Notes

References

External links 
 ATP rankings
 ATP race

+Rankings
ATP
Sports world rankings
Association of Tennis Professionals